Mike Fellows, also known as Miighty Flashlight, is an American musician who has performed and recorded with a variety of groups and artists since the early 1980s, notably Rites of Spring, Silver Jews, and Endless Boogie.

References

Living people
American rock bass guitarists
Male bass guitarists
1959 births
20th-century American guitarists
Silver Jews members
Rites of Spring members
20th-century American male musicians
Government Issue members